The 1967–68 Sussex County Football League season was the 43rd in the history of Sussex County Football League a football competition in England.

Division One

Division One featured 14 clubs which competed in the division last season, along with two new clubs, promoted from Division Two:
Arundel
Wadhurst

League table

Division Two

Division Two featured 13 clubs which competed in the division last season, along with two new clubs, relegated from Division One:
Shoreham
Whitehawk

League table

References

1967-68
S